The men's mass start race of the 2015–16 ISU Speed Skating World Cup 1, arranged in the Olympic Oval, in Calgary, Alberta, Canada, was held on 15 November 2015.

Bart Swings of Belgium won the race, while Jorrit Bergsma of the Netherlands came second, and Reyon Kay of New Zealand came third. Viktor Hald Thorup of Denmark won the Division B race.

Results

The race took place on Sunday, 15 November, in the afternoon session, with Division A scheduled at 15:37, and Division B scheduled at 18:42.

Division A

Division B

References

Men mass start
1